is a Japanese female wrestler, mixed martial artist and kickboxer.

Background

Professional wrestling career

Ichii debuted in 2004 in a match against Emi Sakura.

Mixed martial arts career

On  at Square Jungle's event Heisei Battle in the Square Jungle, Ichii defeated Megumi Watanabe by guillotine choke submission in 25 seconds.

She was defeated by unanimous decision.

Kickboxing career

On  at the Martial Arts Japan Kickboxing Federation event Break Through 8: Breach, Ichii fought to a majority draw against Mika Nagai.

On  at Shoot Boxing World Tournament Girls S-cup 2010, Ichii defeated Sumie Yamada by majority decision in the tournament's reserve bout.

Mixed martial arts record

|-
| Loss
| align=center| 4-5-0
| Hiroko Kitamura
| Decision (0-3)
| Jewels 11th Ring
| 
| align=center| 2
| align=center| 5:00
| Bunkyo, Tokyo, Japan
| 
|-
| Win
| align=center| 4-4-0
| Miyo Yoshida
| Decision (3-0)
| Jewels 10th Ring
| 
| align=center| 2
| align=center| 5:00
| Tokyo, Japan
| 
|-
| Loss
| align=center| 3-4-0
| Seo Hee Ham
| Decision (0-3)
| Jewels 9th Ring
| 
| align=center| 2
| align=center| 5:00
| Tokyo, Japan
| 
|-
| Loss
| align=center| 3-3-0
| Saori Ishioka
| Submission (armbar)
| Jewels 8th Ring
| 
| align=center| 2
| align=center| 2:41
| Tokyo, Japan
| 
|-
| Loss
| align=center| 3-2-0
| Mika Nagano
| Decision (0-3)
| Jewels 7th Ring
| 
| align=center| 2
| align=center| 5:00
| Tokyo, Japan
| 
|-
| Win
| align=center| 3-1-0
| Megumi Watanabe
| Submission (guillotine choke)
| Square Jungle: Heisei Battle in the Square Jungle
| 
| align=center| 1
| align=center| 0:25
| Tokyo, Japan
| 
|-
| Win
| align=center| 2-1-0
| Satoko Shinashi
| Decision (2-0)
| Deep: 35 Impact
| 
| align=center| 2
| align=center| 5:00
| Tokyo, Japan
| 
|-
| Win
| align=center| 1-1-0
| Yukiko Seki
| TKO (punches)
| Square Jungle: Strong Soldiers' Conquest
| 
| align=center| 2
| align=center| 3:14
| Tokyo, Japan
| 
|-
| Loss
| align=center| 0-1-0
| Emi Fujino
| Decision (0-3)
| Smackgirl 2006: Legend of Extreme Women
| 
| align=center| 2
| align=center| 5:00
| Tokyo, Japan
|

Kickboxing record

Legend:

Championships and accomplishments

Professional wrestling
Ice Ribbon
International Ribbon Tag Team Championship (1 time) – with GENTARO

Mixed martial arts
Universal Kickboxing Federation Women's MMA Intercontinental Championship

See also
List of female mixed martial artists
List of female kickboxers

References

External links
 Mai Ichii Awakening Profile

Profile at Fightergirls.com
Profile at Ice Ribbon 
Official blog 

Japanese female mixed martial artists
Mixed martial artists utilizing kickboxing
Mixed martial artists utilizing wrestling
Japanese female kickboxers
Japanese female professional wrestlers
1980 births
Living people
People from Ageo, Saitama
Sportspeople from Saitama Prefecture